John Barry (1845 – 27 January 1921) He was born in Wexford and moved with his family to England when he was a small child. Alongside Michael Davitt and Mark Ryan he trafficked arms. He was a member of the Supreme Council of the Irish Republican Brotherhood and a founding member of the Home Rule Confederation of Great Britain. He was elected as an Irish Nationalist Member of Parliament for South Wexford in 1885, resigning in 1893. He was a close friend and distant cousin of T. M. Healy M.P. On his retirement he pursued his business interests with great success.

In R. Barry O'Brien's 'The Life of Charles Stewart Parnell', 'X' describes John Barry as 'fat and well favoured'. He was one of 'the stoutest men of the Irish party'.

References

 Dictionary of Irish Biography.

External links 
 

1845 births
Members of the Parliament of the United Kingdom for County Wexford constituencies (1801–1922)
UK MPs 1880–1885
UK MPs 1885–1886
UK MPs 1886–1892
Irish Parliamentary Party MPs
1921 deaths
Anti-Parnellite MPs